Burnaby-Edmonds is a provincial electoral district for the Legislative Assembly of British Columbia, Canada.

Geography 
The district is located in southern Burnaby, British Columbia. It is bordered by Boundary Road to the east, Imperial and Mayfield Streets to the north, 4th Street to the east, and 10th Avenue and Fraser River to the south.

Electoral history

Election results 

|-

|-
 
|NDP
|Raj Chouhan
|align="right"|10,337
|align="right"|46.71%
|align="right"|+5.23%
|align="right"|$71,644

|-

|-
 
|NDP
||Fred G. Randall
|align="right"|9,912
|align="right"|46.45%
|align="right"|-0.70%
|align="right"|$41,298

|-

|Natural Law
|Guy Harvey
|align="right"|77
|align="right"|0.36%
|align="right"|
|align="right"|$136

|-
 
|NDP
|Fred G. Randall
|align="right"|9,947
|align="right"|47.15%
|align="right"|
|align="right"|$75,824
|-

|Independent
|Kurt Gruen
|align="right"|74
|align="right"|0.35%
|align="right"|
|align="right"|$2,386

References

External links 
Statement of Votes, 40th BC General Election
BC Stats
Map of electoral district after 2008 redistribution
Results of 2001 election (pdf)
2001 Expenditures (pdf)
Results of 1996 election
1996 Expenditures
Results of 1991 election
1991 Expenditures
Website of the Legislative Assembly of British Columbia

British Columbia provincial electoral districts
Politics of Burnaby
Provincial electoral districts in Greater Vancouver and the Fraser Valley